Theretra sumbaensis is a moth of the  family Sphingidae. It is known from western Sumba in Indonesia.

References

Theretra
Moths described in 2010